Felix I. Batista (disappeared 10 December 2008) is a Cuban-American anti-kidnapping expert and former U.S. Army major who has negotiated resolution to nearly 100 kidnapping and ransom cases, dozens of them in Mexico. Batista was a consultant for Houston, Texas-based security firm ASI Global. In December 2008, he was kidnapped in Mexico.

Kidnapping
On 10 December 2008, Batista was kidnapped outside a restaurant in Saltillo, Coahuila, Mexico by unknown assailants while there to speak and give anti-kidnapping advice.

Batista was working as a negotiator to secure the release of a friend of his, while he was in a restaurant with several other people he received a phone call advising that the victim had been released and a car was being sent for him. As Batista left the restaurant he was forced into a Jeep by a group of four people who had been waiting for him. An hour later the kidnapping victim was released.

Since then, no one has had any communication with him and no one has ever claimed responsibility for his kidnapping .

A statement from Batista's family said there was no sign of violence at the scene.

Military
Felix I. Batista, while a Major in the Florida Army National Guard and commander of a Military Intelligence Company was instrumental in developing a field training exercise called "Red Scorpion" which is now used NGB-wide by other National Guard Military Intelligence units.

See also
List of people who disappeared

References

2000s missing person cases
Hostage negotiators
Missing people
Missing person cases in Mexico
United States Army officers